Pinware is a town in the Canadian province of Newfoundland and Labrador. The town has a population of 64, according to the Canada 2021 Census.

The town is located along Route 510 in Labrador, between L'Anse-au-Diable and Red Bay.

The community has been formerly known as Riviere des François, Pirouette River, and Black Bay. It is believed the name is a corruption of Pied Noir (black foot) from the shape of a rock found at the mouth of Black Rock Brook.

Demographics 

Its 2016 census count of 88 was a decrease from its 2011 population of 107.

Economy 
Pinware was once a fishing community.

References

See also
 List of cities and towns in Newfoundland and Labrador

Towns in Newfoundland and Labrador
Populated places in Labrador